...Of Frost and War is the debut studio album by Dutch death metal band Hail of Bullets. It was released on May 12, 2008, by Metal Blade Records.

The album is a concept album about the fighting in the Eastern Front of World War II between German and Soviet forces, starting with Operation Barbarossa and ending with the Battle of Berlin.

Track listing

Personnel
Hail of Bullets
Martin van Drunen - vocals
Stephan Gebedi - guitars
Paul Baayens - guitars
Ed Warby - drums
Theo van Eekelen - bass

Production
Mick Koopman - artwork
Hans Pieters - engineering, engineering (vocals)
Dan Swanö - mastering, mixing
Eugene Straver - photography
Chris van der Valk - engineering (vocals)

References

2008 debut albums
Hail of Bullets albums
Metal Blade Records albums
Albums produced by Dan Swanö
Concept albums